The WSE Continental Cup is an annual roller hockey match organised by the World Skate Europe - Rink Hockey since 1980, and contested by the winners of the top two European club competitions, the WSE Champions League (1st tier) and the WSE Cup (2nd tier).

The current winners are Portuguese side AD Valongo, which defeated Italian side GSH Trissino 2–1 in a rematch of the 2021–22 Rink Hockey Euroleague final to win their first international title.

History
It was originally contested by the winners of the European Cup and the Cup Winners' Cup, both organised by the Comité Européen de Rink-Hockey. 
In 1997, following the merging of the two competitions to form the Champions League, the Continental Cup began being contested against the winners of the CERS Cup (currently WSE Cup).
Mainly contested in a two-team format (one or two legs), it has been played in a final-four format involving the two top-ranked teams of each European club competition since 2017 (except in 2021, played as a one-legged match between two teams).

Matches

Performances

By teams

By countries

References

 
Roller hockey competitions in Europe
Recurring sporting events established in 1980
1980 establishments in Europe